Adailson Freire Pereira da Silva (born 8 February 1997), known as Dadá Belmonte or simply Dadá, is a Brazilian footballer who plays as an attacking midfielder for América Mineiro.

Club career

Salgueiro
Born in São José do Belmonte, Pernambuco, Dadá joined Salgueiro's youth setup in 2015. Promoted to the first team for the 2016 season, he made his senior debut on 1 March of that year, coming on as a late substitute in a 3–1 Campeonato Pernambucano away win against América-PE.

After being rarely used in 2016, Dadá started to feature more regularly in 2017, and scored his first goal on 18 January by netting his team's third in a 3–1 win at América-PE. On 17 October 2017, he was loaned to Internacional, but only appeared for their under-23 team.

Água Santa
Dadá moved to Água Santa for the 2019 campaign, and helped the club in their promotion from the Campeonato Paulista Série A2 with nine goals. He was the second-best top scorer of the competition, only two goals behind teammate Alvinho.

Loan to Ponte Preta
On 14 May 2019, Dadá was loaned to Série B side Ponte Preta until the end of the year. He was sparingly used during his period at the club, starting in only three matches.

Loan to Náutico
After suffering relegation from the 2020 Campeonato Paulista with Água Santa, Dadá was loaned to another Série B club, Náutico, until the end of the campaign. He featured regularly during his loan spell, scoring twice in 31 appearances as his side narrowly avoided relegation.

Loans to Goiás
Back to Água Santa for the 2021 season, Dadá scored seven times and helped in their promotion from the Paulista A2 before moving on loan to Goiás on 2 June 2021. On 4 December, after helping the latter team in their promotion to the Série A, he agreed to return to Água Santa for the 2022 Campeonato Paulista and then rejoin Goiás on loan.

Dadá made his top tier debut on 16 April 2022, starting in a 1–1 home draw against Palmeiras. Regularly used, he scored his first goal in the category on 23 July, netting the opener in a 3–3 draw at São Paulo.

América Mineiro
On 25 December 2022, Dadá was announced at fellow first division side América Mineiro on a three-year contract.

Career statistics

References

External links

1997 births
Living people
Sportspeople from Pernambuco
Brazilian footballers
Association football midfielders
Campeonato Brasileiro Série A players
Campeonato Brasileiro Série B players
Campeonato Brasileiro Série C players
Salgueiro Atlético Clube players
Esporte Clube Água Santa players
Associação Atlética Ponte Preta players
Clube Náutico Capibaribe players
Goiás Esporte Clube players
América Futebol Clube (MG) players